William Llewellyn Wilson was a Baltimore-born African American conductor, musician and music educator. He was the first conductor of the first African American symphony in the city of Baltimore. A notable cellist, Wilson was also a music critic for the Afro-American, a major African American periodical in Baltimore in the early 20th century.

Eubie Blake was one of Wilson's composition students.

References

Further reading 

 Fields, Andrew Joseph Carl. (1990) William Llewellyn Wilson: A Biography (M.A. Thesis). Morgan State University.

Year of birth missing
Year of death missing
American conductors (music)
American male conductors (music)
American cellists
Musicians from Baltimore